Opal Hills is a sub-range of the Queen Elizabeth Ranges in Jasper National Park, Alberta, Canada. There is an 8.2 km (5.1 mi) hiking trail.

Climate

Based on the Köppen climate classification, the Opal Hills are located in a subarctic climate with cold, snowy winters, and mild summers.

References

External links
Parks Canada site

Hills of Alberta